Sela pri Višnji Gori is a small village in the hills northeast of Višnja Gora in the Municipality of Ivančna Gorica in central Slovenia. The area is part of the historical region of Lower Carniola. The municipality is now included in the Central Slovenia Statistical Region.

Name
The name of the settlement was changed from Sela to Sela pri Višnji Gori in 1953.

Church
The local church is dedicated to Saint George and belongs to the Parish of Višnja Gora. It dates to the second half of the 15th century.

References

External links
Sela pri Višnji Gori on Geopedia

Populated places in the Municipality of Ivančna Gorica